Robert James Jonker (born March 9, 1960) is a United States district judge of the United States District Court for the Western District of Michigan.

Education and career

Born in Holland, Michigan, Jonker received a Bachelor of Arts degree from Calvin College in 1982 and a Juris Doctor from the University of Michigan Law School in 1985. He was a law clerk for Judge John F. Feikens of the United States District Court for the Eastern District of Michigan, from 1985 to 1987. He was in private practice in Grand Rapids, Michigan, from 1987 to 2007.

Federal judicial service

On March 19, 2007, Jonker was nominated by President George W. Bush to a seat on the United States District Court for the Western District of Michigan vacated by Gordon Jay Quist. Jonker was confirmed by the United States Senate on July 9, 2007, and received his commission on July 16, 2007. He became Chief Judge on July 18, 2015. and served until July 17, 2022.

References

External links 

|-

1960 births
Living people
21st-century American judges
Judges of the United States District Court for the Western District of Michigan
People from Holland, Michigan
United States district court judges appointed by George W. Bush
University of Michigan Law School alumni